Gran Hermano 5 is the fifth season of the reality television series Gran Hermano which was broadcast in Spain on Telecinco and La Siete and produced by Endemol. Season 5 lasted for 113 days from September 21, 2003 to January 11, 2004. Nuria Yáñez emerged as the winner.

Start Date: September 21, 2003
End Date: January 11, 2004

Duration: 113 days

The Finalists: 3 - Nuria "Fresita" (The Winner), David (Runner-up) and Julián (3rd)

Evicted Housemates: 10 - Aída, Ainhoa, Beatriz, Carla, Denís, Laura, Luhay, Nico, Ramón and Vanessa

In 2010, season Gran Hermano: El Reencuentro, Nico and Ainhoa return at the house.

Aída Nízar was in Supervivientes: Perdidos en Honduras in 2011. In 2017, she entered in Gran Hermano VIP 5. And in 2018, she participanted in the 15th Italian version of Grande Fratello.

Contestants in eviction order

Nominations Table 
This Series Housemates Nominated Housemates for 3, 2 and 1 Nomination points (shown in numerical order in the Nomination Box - with 3 points at the top and 1 point at the bottom). The three or more Housemates with the most Nomination Points would face the Public Vote.
Each Week the winner(s) of a challenge wins the right to remove 3 Nomination Points from the Housemate(s) of their choice and potentially change the Nomination line-up.

Notes

2003 Spanish television seasons
2004 Spanish television seasons
GH 5